At Large may refer to

At-large, a political term relating to elections
At Large (album), a 1959 album by The Kingston Trio
Editor-at-large